Sreeya Remesh is an Indian actress who predominantly works in Malayalam movies and television  shows

Early life and education

Sreeya was born to Ramachandran Pillai and Ratnamma Ramachandran. She married Remesh Nair and has two children Adraja Remesh and Adrith Remesh. She completed her secondary education from Our Own English High School – Sharjah. After that, she went to Sanatana Dharma College – Alapuzha for further studies.

After her B.com there she was married and settled in Trivandrum with her husband, there she had done many dramas, add films, comparing, anchoring and short films. From there she started her acting career in serials started with Kumkumapoovu, Sathyameva Jayathey Mayamohini and Ezhu Sundara Rathrikal. She has acted in Tamil, Telugu, Malayalam, Kannada films and TV serials.

Career

Sreeya made her film debut with the family drama Ennum Eppozhum in Malayalam cinema. According to Sreeya, her role of "Dr. Usha" in the film was a turning point in her life. Her next films were Vettah, Aneezia, Oppam, Daffedar, etc..

Filmography

Television

Films

References

External links 
 

21st-century Indian actresses
Living people
Actresses in Malayalam television
Actresses in Malayalam cinema
Indian television actresses
Indian film actresses
Actresses in Tamil cinema
Actresses in Kannada cinema
Actresses in Telugu television
Thiruvananthapuram district
Year of birth missing (living people)